Deccan Airways Limited was a commercial airline based at Begumpet Airport in the erstwhile Hyderabad State. It was owned by the Nizam of Hyderabad and Tata Airlines.

History
Founded in 1945, it was one of the nine airlines existing in India during independence. The airline was a joint venture of Nizam Government of erstwhile Hyderabad State and Tata Airlines. 71 per cent of Deccan Airways was owned by the Nizam's Government and the rest was owned by Tata Sons and others. Commercial operations were launched with a fleet of three aircraft in July 1946, operating a twice weekly service between Madras and Delhi, with halts at Hyderabad, Nagpur, Bhopal and Gwalior. It also flew a twice weekly Hyderabad-Bangalore flight. By March 1947, the airline had seven aircraft in its fleet and was operating the Madras- Delhi flight daily as well as a daily  Hyderabad - Bombay flight. Between July 1946, and May 1947, the airline had carried more than Eleven thousand passengers, apart from 51 tonnes of freight, and almost seven tonnes of mail.

Post-Annexation
After Operation Polo for annexing Hyderabad State, the airline ownership changed to Government of India. By 1952 Government of India held 78% of shares of Deccan Airways. The shares were acquired from the Hyderabad Government & Nizam State Railways. 13% of the shares was still held by Tatas & 9% by the general public

Nationalization
In 1953 Deccan Airways Limited along with seven other airlines under the Air Corporations Act were merged to form a single domestic carrier, Indian Airlines. After this on 10 October 1953, Deccan Airways resigned its associate membership of IATA.

Fleet
By the time it was merged with Indian Airlines in 1953, it had a fleet of thirteen Douglas DC-3 'Dakota' aircraft. The DC-3 aircraft were brought from US Air Force at a throw away price after they were left unused at Assam after World War 2.

Accidents and incidents  

5 April 1950 A Deccan Airways C-47A (registration VT-CJD) crashed at Hatiara, while attempting to return to Dum Dum Airport after an engine failed, killing all three crew;
21 November 1951 A Deccan Airways C-47A (registration VT-AUO) crashed at Dum Dum Airport, while attempting to land was made in extremely poor visibility conditions, killing all four crew and thirteen passengers;
19 February 1952 A Deccan Airways C-47A (registration VT-AXE) crashed on landing at Sonegaon Airport due to pilot error and possible misread altimeter, killing three of 16 on board.
30 April 1952 A Deccan Airways C-47A (registration VT-AUN) crashed at Safdarjung Airport, Delhi due to engine failure, killing four crew and five passengers.

See also 
:Category:Establishments in Hyderabad State

References 

Airlines established in 1945
Airlines disestablished in 1953
Defunct airlines of India
Companies nationalised by the Government of India
Hyderabad State
Indian Airlines
Air India
Establishments in Hyderabad State
Indian companies established in 1945
1953 disestablishments in India